The , also known as the  or  or simply as the , is a collection of canon law compiled and written in the 12th century as a legal textbook by the jurist known as Gratian.

Overview
In the first half of the 12th century Gratian, clusinus episcopus, probably a jurist of the ecclesiastical forum and a teacher,  at the monastery of Saints Nabor and Felix (according to the Bolognese Odofredus Denariis [13th century]) and starting from the 18th century believed to have been a Camaldolese monk, composed the work he called , and others titled , or the more commonly accepted name, a living text, characterized by multiple editorial stages. He did this to obviate the difficulties which beset the study and the forensic application of practical, external theology, i.e., the study and the forensic use of canon law. In spite of its great reputation and wide diffusion, the  has never been recognized by the Church as an official collection.

 The second part contains 36 causes, divided into questions, and treat of ecclesiastical administration, procedural issues and marriage.  3 of  33 on penance is treated separately and subdivided into 7 distinctions. 
 The third part  deals with sacramental and liturgical law and contains 5 distinctions.

Gratian himself raises questions and brings forward difficulties, which he answers by quoting , i. e. canons of councils, decretals of the popes, texts of the Scripture or of the Fathers.

The Roman revisers of the 16th century (1566–1582) corrected the text of the "Decree" and added many critical notes designated by the words .

Citing the  
The  is cited by referring to the larger units of the distinction or the cause and question, and then the specific canon or dictum. The Part is usually not included, as the citation form is different for each.

Citation styles for the  have changed over time and can generally be categorised under the modern, obsolescent, and obsolete forms.

Modern form 
This form, common since the twentieth century, cites all units in Arabic numerals, from largest unit to smallest unit.

Distinctions are referenced by an uppercase "D.", Causes by an uppercase "C.", questions by a lowercase "q.", and canons by a lowercase "c.". Gratian's  are referred to with a lowercase "d. a. c." (for commentary preceding the canon) or "d. p. c." (for commentary following the canon).

Examples:

 [Part I] D. 23 c.7 
 [Part II] C. 15 q. 2 c. 4 
 [Part II] C. 23 q. 8 d. p. c. 25 
 [Part II, ] D. 3 de pen. c. 24 
 [Part III] D. 2 de cons. c. 82

Obsolescent form 
Commonly used between the seventeenth and early twentieth centuries, this form generally begins with a reference to the smallest unit in Arabic numerals, followed by the Distinction or Cause in Roman numerals and (if required) the question in Arabic numerals, e.g. "c. 5, C.3 q.1".

Obsolete form 
This is the form used by medieval and early modern writers, falling out of use after the eighteenth century. Major divisions were cited with (usually Roman) numerals. Since the numbering of the 's capitula only became standard in the sixteenth century, canons were cited by their opening word(s). Two or more canons beginning with the same word/phrase might be distinguished with numbers, e.g. .

Examples (using the same references as above):

 
  
  
 
 

Author

Gratian was a canon lawyer from Etruria, probably operating in the former feudal state of Matilda of Tuscany (mainly in Tuscany and Emilia region) as well as in Reims (1131), Rome, Bologna, Venice (1143) and Chiusi. He flourished in the second quarter of the twelfth century. He died on 10 August around the middle of the 12th century as bishop of Chiusi in Tuscany. Little else is known about him.

He is sometimes incorrectly referred to as Franciscus Gratianus, Johannes Gratian, or Giovanni Graziano. For a long time he was believed to have been born around 1100, at Ficulle in Umbria, based on a chronicle of illustrious men of the 14th century attributed to an exponent of the powerful Colonna family, who had possessions in Ficulle. He was said to have become a monk at Camaldoli and then taught at the monastery of St. Felix in Bologna and devoted his life to studying theology and canon law, but contemporary scholars do not attach credibility to these traditions.

In the second half of the 11th century and at the beginning of the 12th century Roman law was generally studied and applied only in the cities (seat of the diocese) in which there was an imperial Prefecture, where imperial and ecclesiastical jurists (and courts) coexisted (such as Pisa and Bologna), with mutual interference. However, from the first editorial stages of the  it is clear that Gratian had little knowledge of Roman law and that he had a great sense of depth in the disputes dealt with in the ecclesiastical seats, especially in the appeal judgments dealt with in the Roman curia. Therefore, some scholars today exclude that he was trained in Justinian Roman law and that (at the beginning of his career) he worked mainly in certain cities (such as Arezzo, Pisa or Bologna) where Roman law was known and applied for years, it being plausible that he came from an episcopal city in which all jurisdiction, both civil and ecclesiastical, was dealt with by the only court present: the ecclesiastical one. Perhaps also for this reason he feels the need to create a legal work to be applied only in ecclesial courts and only for cases relating to canon law, putting an end to the mixture between civil and ecclesiastical jurisdictions. It is no coincidence that Dante Alighieri writes that he helped "one and the other forum", that is, he separated the canonical jurisdiction from the civil one. Gratian's work was an attempt, using early scholastic method, to reconcile seemingly contradictory canons from previous centuries. Gratian quoted a great number of authorities, including the Bible, papal and conciliar legislation, church fathers such as Augustine of Hippo, and secular law in his efforts to reconcile the canons. Gratian found a place in Dante's Paradise among the doctors of the Church: 

Many of his disciples have become highly renowned canonists.

Textual history
The vulgate version of Gratian's collection was completed at some point after the Second Council of the Lateran of 1139, which it quotes. Research by Anders Winroth established that some manuscripts of an early version of Gratian's text, which differs considerably from the mainstream textual tradition, have survived.
The  quickly became the standard textbook for students of canon law throughout Europe, but it never received any formal, official recognition by the papacy.

As late as 1997, scholars commonly set the date of completion at 1140, but this accuracy in dating is not possible after Anders Winroth's groundbreaking scholarship. Winroth's research shows that the  existed in two published recensions. The first dates to sometime after 1139, while the second dates to 1150 at the latest. There are several major differences between the two recensions:
The first recension is a more coherent and analytical work.
The second recension places a much greater emphasis on papal primacy and power.

These differences led Winroth to conclude that Roman law was not as far developed by 1140 as scholars had previously thought. He has also argued that the second recension was due not to the original author of the first recension (whom he calls Gratian 1), but rather another jurist versed in Roman law. However, Winroth's thesis of two Gratians remains controversial.

This field of inquiry is hampered by ignorance of the compiler's identity and the existence of manuscripts with abbreviated versions of the text or variant versions not represented by Winroth's two recensions.

Criticism 
One of Luther's chief concerns surrounded  40 (Chapter "") which reads: 

Additional concerns about papal primacy in the context of 2 Thessalonians 2:4 were raised regarding Distinctio 96 chapter 7 which reads:

Sources 
Gratian's sources were Roman law, the Bible, the writings of (or attributed to) the Church Fathers, papal decretals, the acts of church councils and synods. In most cases, Gratian obtained the material not from a direct reading of the sources but rather through intermediate collections. Thanks to the research of modern scholars (in particular Charles Munier, Titus Lenherr, and Peter Landau) it is now known that Gratian made use of a relatively-small number of collections in the composition of most of the :

Anselm (II) of Lucca's canonical collection, originally compiled around 1083 and existing in four main recensions: A, B, Bb, and C. Peter Landau suggests that Gratian probably employed a manuscript containing an expanded form of recension A which he calls recension A’;
the  attributed to Ivo of Chartres, usually thought to date to 1095;
Gregory of St. Grisogono's , completed some time after 1111;
secular texts such as Plato (Greek version – there was still no Latin translation);

Other sources are known to have been used in the composition of particular sections of the :
Isidore of Seville's Etymologies for DD. 1-9 (the so-called Treatise on Laws);
Alger of Liège's  for C. 1;

Effect 

Gratian himself named his work  – "Concord of Discordant Canons". The name is fitting: Gratian tried to harmonize apparently contradictory canons with each other, by discussing different interpretations and deciding on a solution, as a judge in a case. These legists are known as the decretists.

These commentaries were called glosses. Editions printed in the 15th, 16th or 17th century frequently included the glosses along with the text. Systematic commentaries were called . Some of these  were soon in circulation as well and obtained the same level of fame as the  itself. Early commentators included Paucapalea and Magister Rolandus. The most important commentators were probably Rufin of Bologna (died before 1192) and Huguccio (died 1210).

Peter Lombard borrowed and adapted from the  when discussing penance in his Sentences (c. 1150).

Importance to Western law

The  served as a model for 12th-century jurists in the formation of Western law, based on rational rules and evidence to replace barbaric laws which often involved trial by ordeal or battle.

The  has been called "the first comprehensive and systematic legal treatise in the history of the West, and perhaps in the history of mankind – if by 'comprehensive' is meant the attempt to embrace virtually the entire law of a given polity, and if by 'systematic' is meant the express effort to codify that law as a single body, in which all parts are viewed as interacting to form a whole." The  made a direct contribution to the development of Western law in areas that it dealt with such as marriage, property and inheritance. Specific concepts included consent for marriage, and wrongful intent in determining whether a certain act constituted a crime.

References

Bibliography
Brundage, James. Law, Sex, and Christian Society in Medieval Europe. University of Chicago Press, 1990. 
Brundage, James. The Medieval Origins of the Legal Profession. University of Chicago Press, 2008.
Donahue, Charles, Jr. A Crisis of Law? Reflections on the Church and the Law Over the Centuries in The Jurist 65 (2005) I-30.
Hartmann, Wilfried, and Kenneth Pennington, edited. The History of Medieval Canon Law in the Classical Period, 1140-1234: From Gratian to the Decretals of Pope Gregory IX (Washington, D.C.: The Catholic University of America Press, 2008).
 Kuttner, Stephan. Research on Gratian: Acta and Agenda, in Proceedings of the Seventh International Congress of Medieval Canon Law, Cambridge, 23-27 July 1984, Linehan, Peter edited (Monumenta Iuris Canonici. Series C: Subsidia), Vatican City 1988, 3-26.
Landau, Peter. "Gratians Arbeitsplan." In Iuri canonico promovendo: Festschrift für Heribert Schmitz zum 65. Geburtstag. Regensburg: F. Pustet, 1994. pp. 691–707.
Landau, Peter. "Neue Forschungen zu vorgratianischen Kanonessammlungen und den Quellen des gratianischen Dekrets." Ius Commune 11 (1984): 1-29. Reprinted in idem. Kanones und Dekretalen. pp. 177*-205*
Landau, Peter. "Quellen und Bedeutung des gratianischen Dekrets," Studia et Documenta Historiae et Juris 52 (1986): 218–235. Reprinted in idem. Kanones und Dekretalen. pp. 207*-224*.
Larsen, Atria A. Master of Penance: Gratian and the Development of Penitential Thought and Law in the Twelfth Century, Washington D.C.: The Catholic University of America Press 2014.
Larson, Atria A. Gratian's Tractatus de penitentia: A New Latin Edition with English Translation Washington D.C.: The Catholic University of America Press, 2016.
Lenherr, Titus. Die Exkommunikations- und Depositionsgewalt der Häretiker bei Gratian und den Dekretisten bis zur Glossa ordinaria des Johannes Teutonicus. St. Ottilien: EOS Verlag, 1987.
Munier, Charles. Les sources patristiques du droit de l’église du VIIIe au XIIIe siècle. Mulhouse 1957.
Noonan, John T. "Gratian slept here: the changing identity of the father of the systematic study of canon law." Traditio 35 (1979), 145–172.
Wei, John C. Gratian the Theologian. Washington D.C.: The Catholic University of America Press, 2016.
Werckmeister, Jean. Le mariage. Décret de Gratien (causes 27 à 36). Paris: Cerf, 2011.
Winroth, Anders. The Making of Gratian's Decretum. New York: Cambridge University Press, 2004.
Winroth, Anders. "Recent Work on the Making of Gratian's Decretum," Bulletin of Medieval Canon Law 26 (2008).

External links 
 
 
 Full Latin text from the Bayerische Staatsbibliothek Decretum magistri Gratiani. Editio Lipsiensis secunda, post Aemilii Ludovici Richteri curas, ad librorum manu scriptorum et editionis Romanae fidem recognovit et adnotatione critica instruxit Aemilius Friedberg. Leipzig, B. Tauchnitz, 1879. (Corpus iuris canonici ; 1)
 Critical edition in progress, currently only of parts of the shorter first recension of the Decretum, edited by Anders Winroth
 Otto Vervaart's introduction to Canon Law
 Domus Gratiani
 The Stephan Kuttner Institute of Medieval Canon Law in Munich

Canon law codifications
Latin texts
Medieval law
12th-century Latin books
12th-century jurists